Marietta Independent School District was a public school district based in Marietta, Texas (USA).  The district had one school, Marietta Elementary, which served students in grades pre-kindergarten through six.

The school closed on September 1, 2008 and merged with Pewitt Consolidated Independent School District.

References

External links
 
 Map of Cass County showing area school districts prior to MISD consolidation - Texas Education Agency - Web version

Former school districts in Texas
School districts disestablished in 2008
2008 disestablishments in Texas
School districts in Cass County, Texas